ACEN  may refer to:

 Assembly of Captive European Nations, defunct organization for nations in the Soviet Bloc
 Accreditation Commission for Education in Nursing, an educational accrediting body
 Anime Central, an annual anime convention